Kearney Memorial Field is a baseball ballpark located in Kearney, Nebraska. It is currently the home stadium of the University of Nebraska at Kearney baseball team and once served as the home field for the Kearney Yankees, a New York Yankees Class "D" minor league affiliate in the Nebraska League. and The Kearney Irishmen 

The Stadium replaced the ballpark at the fairgrounds.

Built just after World War II, it currently seats over 2,000 people.

The Ball Park is also home to the Joba Chamberlain Indoor Hitting Center, built in 2008 and named after MLB Baseball Player, Joba Chamberlain. The facility is utilized by the University of Nebraska Kearney Baseball and Softball Teams.

References

Baseball venues in Nebraska
1946 establishments in Nebraska